Mouneer Al-Shaarani (born September 6, 1952) is a Syrian graphic artist specialized in Arabic calligraphy. Al-Shaarani is known as calligrapher, graphic designer and author of articles about Arabic calligraphy and Arab Islamic art. He has designed several Arabic typefaces for book covers or other graphic creations. His work has been exhibited in several Arab countries, Malaysia, Europe, Australia and the United States and is internationally presented in collections of contemporary Arabic art. Between 1985 and 2007, he lived and worked in Cairo, Egypt, and later returned to live in Damascus.

Artistic profile 
From the age of 10, Al-Shaarani studied the art of Arabic calligraphy under the Syrian calligrapher Muḥammad Badawi Al-Dirany, and until his graduation in 1977, he studied Fine Arts at Damascus University.

Based on his command of traditional Arabic calligraphy, Al-Shaarani has been using historical calligraphic styles, such as Kairouan Kufic, Square Kufic, Thuluth or Maghrebi script, and at the same time, developed and modernized the shapes of the letters according to his personal, modern style. Choosing his texts both from Islamic, as well as from Christian religious sources, but mainly from Arab philosophers or Sufi poets, such as Ibn Arabi, Al-Mutanabbi, or Ibn Sina, he conveys non-religious, but universal messages. An example is this quote from the Lebanese-American poet Khalil Gibran "The whole earth is my homeland and the human family my clan."

Apart from historical quotes, he sometimes also expresses his own contemporary messages, such as in his work entitled There is no creativity where there is no freedom and in his graphic images starting with the message NO TO... "No to killing, no to prison, no to intimidation, no to humiliation, no to hypocrisy, no to oppression, no to violence, no to fear, no to falsehood, no to terrorism, no to corruption." 
Another important aspect of Al-Shaarani's artistic work is his view that "Arabic calligraphy has nothing to do with religion. It is the result of a civilization and not a religion. Religion benefited from calligraphy and not the other way round. The development of Arabic script was not initiated by religion, but by the state of the Umayyads. Second, calligraphy is an art. It has no finality or climax. The Arabic script has no “sacred” status for me."

Among other calligraphic work, Al-Shaarani created the logo for the Syrian group for Arabic classical music, called Takht al-nagham in New York City. Al-Shaarani is also mentioned in the book A History of Arab Graphic Design for his invention of new Arabic calligraphic styles and his calligraphic work for book covers, logos, and typeface design.

Major exhibitions 

 Rietberg Museum, Zurich, Switzerland (1998)
 Shawqi Museum, Cairo (1998)
 Sharjah Art Museum, UAE (2001)
 Gezira Art Center, Cairo (2006)
 Word into Art, the British Museum, London, UK (2006)
 Sharjah Biennial 11, UAE (2013)
Europia Gallery, Paris, France (2016)
Khan al-Maghrebi, Cairo (2022)

See also 

 Arabic calligraphy

References

Further reading 

 Bahia Shehab and Haytham Nawar, A History of Arab Graphic Design. Cairo, Egypt: American University in Cairo Press, 2020. 360 pp.; 659 color ills. ISBN 9789774168918

External links 
 Mouneer Al-Shaarani's official webpage
Mouneer Al-Shaarani on Facebook, with many of his designs
Calligraphic designs by Mouneer Al-Shaarani on artnet.com
 Al Shaarani’s buildings, art historical essay by Emile Mennem on Al-Shaarani's art and intentions
Stars in Symmetry - History of the Kufic Script 
Arabic Calligraphy – Taking A Closer Look

1952 births
Living people
Damascus University alumni
20th-century Syrian artists
21st-century Syrian artists
Calligraphers of Arabic script
Syrian calligraphers
Syrian contemporary artists